Ikbal Hanim (22 October 1876 – 10 February 1941), was the Khediva consort of Egypt from 1895 to 1914 as the first wife of Abbas Hilmi II Pasha, the last Khedive of Egypt and Sudan.

Early life
Of Circassian origin, Ikbal Hanim was born on 22 October 1876 in Constantinople (now Istanbul). She became a slave to the Walida Pasha Emina Ilhamy, wife of Khedive Tewfik, after 1884, when the importation of white slaves became illegal in Egypt. She was then assigned to Abbas's personal service along with two other slave girls.

Marriage
At his accession in 1892, Abbas was only seventeen years old and unmarried. His mother Emina took charge of the search for an appropriate princess for him to wed. She passed over
his first cousin, and nearly succeeded in arranging a union for him
with an Ottoman princess.

In the meantime, Abbas began to have sexual relations with Ikbal, and on 12 February 1895, she gave birth to a girl, named Emina in honor of her grandmother. A contract of marriage between her and the khedive was written on 19 February, seven days later. At the public celebration the khédiveh mere hosted the women's reception. Ikbal eventually bore all of Abbas's six children, Princess Atiyaullah, born on 9 June 1896, Princess Fathiya, born on 27 November 1897, Prince Muhammad Abdel Moneim, born on 20 February, Princess Lutfiya, born on 29 September 1900, and Prince Muhammad Abdul Kadir, born on 4 February 1902.

By the standards of contemporary Ottoman ruling-class culture,
the fathering of a child by a slave concubine was unexceptional, and
so too was Abbas's decision to raise Iqbal to the status of legal wife.
Both events were duly announced in al-Waqa'i al-Misriyya, which also published some poetry written in honor of the khedival daughter.
The announcements did not allude to Ikbal's previous slave status, something that would have been as rude as it was obvious to contemporaries familiar with upper-class harem culture.

Ikbal admired European fashion in dress and household practices and had European servants and governesses for her three daughters. She studied with her children and had an open, inquiring mind. As Khediva, Ikbal was considered one of Egypt's most beautiful women and was reputed to be a devoted wife, gaining her favor among those around the palace. However, aside from attending ladies-only state functions such as royal weddings or receptions and opera premiers, Ikbal Hanim had no official public role.

Abbas's second wife was Marianna Török, a Hungarian aristocrat from Philadelphia, whom he first met during a holiday in Europe. They married secretly after 1900, and she used to accompany him on trips. She converted to Islam, and she and the khedive were remarried, officially, at the end of February 1910. The marriage was dissolved three years later in 1913. In her memoirs, Marianna mused, "it is curious to think that my husband has two wives."

On 14 January 1925, Şehzade Mehmed Abdülkadir, son of Sultan Abdul Hamid II, gave the power of attorney to Sami Günzberg, a well-known Turkish Jewish lawyer, authorising him to regain from usurpers buildings, lands, mines, concessions left by Abdul Hamid situated in Turkish territory and elsewhere, after which, he sold Abdülkadir's mansion in Feneryolu to Ikbal.

Death
Ikbal Hanim died  on 10 February 1941 in Feneryolu, Istanbul.

Issue
Together with Abbas Ikbal had six children:
 Princess Emina (Montaza Palace, Alexandria, 12 February 1895 – 1954), unmarried and without issue
 Princess Atiyaullah (Cairo, 9 June 1896 – 1971), married and had issue, two sons.
 Princess Fathiya (27 November 1897 – 30 November 1923), married without issue
 Prince Prince Muhammad Abdel Moneim, Heir Apparent and Regent of Egypt and Sudan, (20 February 1899 – 1 December 1979), married and had issue
 Princess Lutfiya Shavkat (Cairo, 29 September 1900 – 1975), married and had issue
 Prince Muhammad Abdul Kadir (4 February 1902 – Montreux, 21 April 1919)

Honour
 Decoration of the Order of Charity, 1st class.

See also
List of consorts of the Muhammad Ali Dynasty

References

Sources

External links

1876 births
1941 deaths
Muhammad Ali dynasty
People from Istanbul
People from Crimea
Arab princesses
Circassians
Egyptian slaves
Slave concubines
19th-century Egyptian women
Egyptian concubines